The discography of Fear Factory, an American heavy metal band, consists of ten studio albums, three compilation albums, two remix albums, one demo album, one video album, five extended plays, twenty-one singles and thirteen music videos. Fear Factory formed in 1989, signing to Roadrunner Records three years later. The band's debut studio album, Soul of a New Machine, was released in 1992. The following year, Fear Is the Mindkiller was released as an EP, featuring remixes by Rhys Fulber and Bill Leeb of Front Line Assembly. In 1995, Fear Factory released their second studio album, Demanufacture, which peaked at number 27 on the UK Albums Chart, and was later certified silver by the British Phonographic Industry (BPI); it was followed two years later by another remix project, Remanufacture (Cloning Technology), which this time featured contributions from a number of different remixers, including many techno-oriented artists, as well as the band themselves.

Released in 1998, Obsolete became the band's most successful album, peaking at number 77 on the Billboard 200 and hitting the top 30 in several countries. The album received a gold certification by the Recording Industry Association of America (RIAA). Their next album, 2001's Digimortal, peaked at number ten in Australia, but by the next year, Fear Factory disbanded and Roadrunner issued their original 1991 recordings on the demo album Concrete. The band reformed sans Dino and signed to the independent record label Liquid 8 for Archetype, released in 2004. The album peaked at number 30 on the Billboard 200 and number 18 in Australia. Transgression was issued by Calvin Records a year later. Dino Cazares rejoined the band in 2009, and they recorded Mechanize, which was released the following year. Mechanize was followed two years later by The Industrialist (2012), and then three years later by Genexus (2015). Due to both legal and personal issues surrounding the band, Fear Factory did not release their next studio album Aggression Continuum until 2021, which marked the last one to include original vocalist Burton C. Bell, who had already recorded his vocals for the album in 2017 and left the band nearly a year prior to its release.

Albums

Studio albums

Compilation albums

Archival albums

Remix albums

Video albums

Extended plays

Singles

Music videos

References

External links
Official website
Fear Factory at AllMusic
 

Heavy metal group discographies
Discographies of American artists